Dartford Science & Technology College (DSTC) is a non-selective school for girls in Dartford, Kent, England. DSTC has moved to a campus it shares with a nursery, primary school and adult education. It has two specialisms: Science and Technology.

DSTC is a foundation school administered by Dartford Community Learning Partnership. The partnership includes Abbott Laboratories, the Co-operative movement, Darent Valley Hospital Trust, Kent County Council, STEMNET and the University of Greenwich.

References

External links
 Dartford Science & Technology College official website

Secondary schools in Kent
Foundation schools in Kent
Girls' schools in Kent
Dartford